The Place You're In is the fourth studio album by blues solo artist Kenny Wayne Shepherd. It was released on October 5, 2004. This is his first album in five years, the last was 1999's Live On.

Track listing
All tracks written by Kenny Wayne Shepherd and Marti Frederiksen, except noted
 "Alive" – 3:44
 "Be Mine" – 4:09
 "Spank" (with Kid Rock) (Kenny Wayne Shepherd/Jamie Houston/Kid Rock) – 3:01
 "Let Go" – 5:02
 "Ain't Selling Out" – 3:15
 "Believe" (with Noah Hunt) (Kenny Wayne Shepherd/Noah Hunt/Marti Frederiksen) – 3:58
 "The Place You're In" (Kenny Wayne Shepherd/Marti Frederiksen/Mikal Reid) – 3:22
 "Hey, What Do You Say" – 5:03
 "Get It Together" – 3:48
 "Burdens" (with Noah Hunt) – 3:39
 "A Little Bit More" (Instrumental) – 3:05

Credits
 Kenny Wayne Shepherd - guitars, vocals
 Marti Frederiksen - bass
 Brian Tichy - drums

Charts
Album - Billboard (United States)

Singles - Billboard (United States)

Kenny Wayne Shepherd albums
2004 albums
Reprise Records albums